Les Tornallyay (14 August 1931 – 26 July 2009) was an Australian fencer. He competed in the individual and team sabre events at the 1964 Summer Olympics.

References

1931 births
2009 deaths
Australian male fencers
Olympic fencers of Australia
Fencers at the 1964 Summer Olympics
Commonwealth Games medallists in fencing
Commonwealth Games silver medallists for Australia
Commonwealth Games bronze medallists for Australia
Fencers at the 1966 British Empire and Commonwealth Games
Fencers at the 1970 British Commonwealth Games
Medallists at the 1966 British Empire and Commonwealth Games
Medallists at the 1970 British Commonwealth Games